Ibateguara is a municipality located in the western of the Brazilian state of Alagoas. Its population is 15,627 (2020) and its area is 261 km².

References

Municipalities in Alagoas